The following outline is provided as an overview of and topical guide to Manipur:

Manipur is a state in northeastern India, with the city of Imphal as its capital. The state covers an area of 22,327 square kilometres (8,621 sq mi). Meitei people (also known as the Manipuris) are the predominant ethnic group of Manipur. Their native language is the Meitei language (officially known as Manipuri language), serving as the lingua franca as well as the sole official language of Manipur, among the different ethnic groups, including the Kuki, Naga, and Pangal peoples, who speak different Sino-Tibetan languages and dialects. Manipur has been at the crossroads of Asian economic and cultural exchange for more than 2,500 years. It has long connected the Indian subcontinent and Central Asia to East/Southeast Asia, Siberia, Micronesia and Polynesia, enabling migration of people, cultures and religions.

General reference

Names 
 Pronunciation: 
 Common English name(s): Manipur
 Official English name(s): Manipur
 Adjectival(s): Manipuri (refers to region while the Meitei language and the Bishnupriya Manipuri language are also referred to with Manipuri as well)
 Demonym(s): Manipuris

Rankings (amongst India's states) 

 by population: 24th
 by area (2011 census): 24th
 by crime rate (2015): 21st
 by gross domestic product (GDP) (2014): 26th
by Human Development Index (HDI): 
by life expectancy at birth: (70)
by literacy rate: (75%)

Geography of Manipur 

Geography of Manipur
 Manipur is: an Indian state and one of the Seven Sister States
 Population of Manipur: 2,855,794 (as of 2011)
 Area of Manipur:  22,327 km2 (8,621 sq mi)
 Atlas of Manipur

Location of Manipur 
 Manipur is situated within the following regions:
 Northern Hemisphere
 Eastern Hemisphere
 Eurasia
 Asia
 South-East Asia
 Northeast India
 Seven Sister States
 Time zone:  Indian Standard Time (UTC+05:30)

Environment of Manipur

Natural geographic features of Manipur 

 Lakes in Manipur
 Loktak Lake
 Pumlenpat 
 Rivers in Manipur

 Barak River
 Manipur River
 Imphal River
 Iril River
 Nambul River
 Sekmai River
 Chakpi River
 Thoubal River
 Khuga River
 Valleys in Manipur
 Barak Valley
 Imphal Valley

Protected areas of Manipur 

 Keibul Lamjao National Park – the only floating national park in the world. It floats atop Loktak Lake.
 Sirohi National Park
 Yangoupokpi-Lokchao Wildlife Sanctuary 
 Manipur Zoological Garden

Regions of Manipur

Ecoregions of Manipur 

 Mizoram-Manipur-Kachin rain forests
 Northeast India-Myanmar pine forests

Administrative divisions of Manipur 

 Districts of Manipur – there are nine:
 Bishnupur district
 Chandel district
 Churachandpur district
 Imphal East district
 Imphal West district
 Senapati district
 Tamenglong district
 Thoubal district
 Ukhrul district
 Cities of Manipur
 Capital of Manipur: Imphal

Demography of Manipur 

Demographics of Manipur

Government and politics of Manipur 

Government of Manipur

 Form of government: 
 Capital of Manipur: Imphal
 Elections in Manipur
 (specific elections)
 Insurgency in Manipur

Branches of the government of Manipur 

Government of Manipur

Executive branch of the government of Manipur 

 Head of state: Governor of Manipur, 
 Head of government: Chief Minister of Manipur, 
 Council of Ministers of Manipur
 Departments and agencies of the Manipuri government
 Manipur Public Service Commission

Legislative branch of the government of Manipur 

Manipur Legislative Assembly (unicameral)
 Inner Manipur (Lok Sabha constituency)
 Outer Manipur (Lok Sabha constituency)

Judicial branch of the government of Manipur 

 Manipur High Court

Law and order in Manipur 

 Human rights abuses in Manipur
 Law enforcement in Manipur
 Manipur Police

History of Manipur 

History of Manipur

History of Manipur, by period

Prehistoric Manipur

Ancient Manipur 
 Ancient Manipur

Medieval Manipur 
 Kingdom of Kangleipak

Colonial Manipur 

 First Anglo-Burmese War (1824-1826)
 Manipur (princely state) – last of the independent states to be incorporated into British India
 Anglo-Manipuri War
 Princely states in India

Contemporary Manipur 

 Battle of Imphal (1944)
 Instrument of Accession (1947)
 Insurgency in Manipur

History of Manipur, by region 

 History of Chandel district
 History of Imphal East district
 History of Senapati district
 History of Thoubal district
 History of Ukhrul district

History of Manipur, by subject

Culture of Manipur 

Culture of Manipur
 Architecture of Manipur
 Cuisine of Manipur
 Monuments in Manipur
 Monuments of National Importance in Manipur
 State Protected Monuments in Manipur
 World Heritage Sites in Manipur
 Meitei inscriptions

Art in Manipur 
 Cinema of Manipur
 Dance of Manipur
 Meitei literature
 Music of Manipur

Festivals in Manipur 
 Lai Haraoba
 Maramfest
 Sajibu Nongma Panba (also known as Sajibu Cheiraoba) 
 Sangai festival
 Yaosang

Language in Manipur 
 Languages of Manipur
 Meitei language
 Paite
 Hmar
 Tangkhul
 Thadou
 Manipuri surnames

People of Manipur 
 Kom people
 Manipur Tamil community
 Meitei people – majority ethnic group of Manipur.
 Inpui Naga
 Hmar people
 Naga people
 Meitei Pangals
 Tangkhul
 Mao
 Kabui
 Maring Naga
 Maram Naga
 Thadou
 Paite
 Anāl Naga
 Poumei

Religion in Manipur 

Religion in Manipur
 Buddhism in Manipur
 All Manipur Buddhist Association
 Christianity in Manipur
 Manipur Baptist Convention
 Roman Catholic Archdiocese of Imphal
 Hinduism in Manipur
 Sanamahism – indigenous ancient animistic religion

Sports in Manipur 

Sports in Manipur
 Cricket in Manipur
 Manipur Cricket Association
 Manipur cricket team
 Football in Manipur
 All Manipur Football Association
 Manipur State League
 Manipur football team

Symbols of Manipur 

Symbols of Manipur
 State animal: Sangai
 State bird: Nongeen
 State flower: Shirui Lily
 State seal: Seal of Manipur
 State tree: Oo-Ningthou

Economy and infrastructure of Manipur 

 Communication in Manipur
 Imphal Free Press
 Tourism in Manipur
 Transport in Manipur
 Imphal International Airport

Education in Manipur 

Education in Manipur
 Institutions of higher education in Manipur
 Manipur University

Health in Manipur 

Health in Manipur

See also 

 Outline of India

References

External links 

 Manipur Government Tourism Website
 Manipur Government Official Website

Manipur
Manipur